The pallium (derived from the Roman pallium or palla, a woolen cloak; : pallia) is an ecclesiastical vestment in the Catholic Church, originally peculiar to the pope, but for many centuries bestowed by the Holy See upon metropolitans and primates as a symbol of their conferred jurisdictional authorities, and still remains a papal emblem.

In its present (western) form, the pallium is a long and "three fingers broad" (narrow) white band adornment, woven from the wool of lambs raised by Trappist monks. It is donned by looping its middle around one's neck, resting upon the chasuble and two dependent lappets over one's shoulders with tail-ends (doubled) on the left with the front end crossing over the rear. When observed from the front or rear the pallium sports a stylistic letter 'y' (contrasting against an unpatterned chasuble). It is decorated with six black crosses, one near each end and four spaced out around the neck loop. At times the pallium is embellished fore, aft and at the left shoulder with three gold gem-headed (dull) stickpins. The doubling and pinning on the left shoulder likely survive from the (simple scarf) Roman pallium.

The pallium and the omophor originate from the same vestment, the latter a much larger and wider version worn by Eastern Orthodox and Eastern Catholic bishops of the Byzantine Rite. A theory relates origination to the paradigm of the Good Shepherd shouldering a lamb, a common early Christian art image (if not icon); the ritual preparation of the pallium and its subsequent bestowal upon a pope at coronation suggests the shepherd symbolism. However, this may be an explanation a posteriori.   The lambs whose fleeces are destined for pallia are solemnly presented at altar by the nuns of the convent of Saint Agnes outside the walls and ultimately the Benedictine nuns of Santa Cecilia in Trastevere weave their wool into pallia.

Usage 
At present, only the pope, metropolitan archbishops within their archdiocese, and the Latin Rite Patriarch of Jerusalem wear the pallium. Under the 1917 Code of Canon Law, a metropolitan had to receive the pallium before exercising his office in his ecclesiastical province, even if he was previously metropolitan elsewhere, but these restrictions were absent in the revised 1983 Code of Canon Law. No other bishops, even non-metropolitan archbishops or retired metropolitans or current metropolitan archbishops officiate or attend any kind of mass or religious ceremony outside their jurisdiction, are allowed to wear the pallium unless they have special permission. An explicit exception is made for the rarely realised scenario in which a person not yet a bishop is elected pope, in which case the bishop ordaining the new pope wears the pallium during the ceremony.

History

Origin 
There are many different opinions concerning the origin of the pallium.  Some trace it to an investiture by Constantine I (or one of his successors); others consider it an imitation of the Hebrew ephod, the humeral garment of the High Priest. Others declare that its origin is traceable to a mantle of St. Peter, which was symbolic of his office as supreme pastor. A fourth hypothesis finds its origin in a liturgical mantle, used by the early popes, which over time was folded into the shape of a band; a fifth says its origin dates from the custom of folding the ordinary mantle-pallium, an outer garment in use in imperial times; a sixth declares that it was introduced as a papal liturgical garment (which, however, was not at first a narrow strip of cloth, but as the name suggests, a broad, oblong, and folded cloth). There is no solid evidence tracing the pallium to an investiture of the emperor, the ephod of the Jewish High Priest, or a fabled mantle of St. Peter. It may well be that it was introduced as a liturgical badge of the pope, or that it was adopted in imitation of its counterpart, the pontifical omophor, already in vogue in the Eastern Church. It was bestowed on papal vicars (like the bishop of Arles, who represented the pope in the regions of Gaul) and other bishops with exclusive links to the Apostolic See. Also in this rank were missionaries sent with papal approval to organise the church among newly converted peoples. St. Augustine of Canterbury in seventh-century England and St. Boniface in eighth-century Germany fell into this category.

Early usage 
It is unknown exactly when the pallium was first introduced. Although Tertullian wrote an essay no later than 220 AD titled De Pallio ("On the Pallium"), according to the Liber Pontificalis, it was first used when Pope Marcus (died 336) conferred the right to wear the pallium on the Bishop of Ostia, because the consecration of the pope appertained to him; Pope Symmachus did the same for St. Cæsarius of Arles in 513, and in numerous other references of the sixth century, the pallium is mentioned as a long-customary vestment. It seems that earlier, the pope alone had the absolute right of wearing the pallium; its use by others was tolerated only by virtue of the permission of the pope. We hear of the pallium being conferred on others, as a mark of distinction, no earlier than the sixth century. The honour was usually conferred on metropolitans, especially those nominated vicars by the pope, but it was sometimes conferred on simple bishops (e.g., on Syagrius of Autun, Donus of Messina, and John of Syracuse by Pope Gregory I).

The use of the pallium among metropolitans did not become general until the eighth century, when a synod convened by St Boniface laid an obligation upon Western metropolitans of receiving their pallium only from the pope in Rome. This was accomplished by journeying there or by forwarding a petition for the pallium accompanied by a solemn profession of faith, all consecrations being forbidden them before the reception of the pallium. The oath of allegiance which the recipient of the pallium takes today apparently originated in the eleventh century, during the reign of Paschal II (1099–1118), and replaced the profession of faith.

The awarding of the pallium became controversial in the Middle Ages, because popes charged a fee from those receiving them, acquiring hundreds of millions of gold florins for the papacy and bringing the award of the pallium into disrepute. It is certain that a tribute was paid for the reception of the pallium as early as the sixth century. This was abrogated by Pope Gregory I in the Roman Synod of 595, but was reintroduced later as partial maintenance of the Holy See. This process was condemned by the Council of Basel in 1432, which referred to it as "the most usurious contrivance ever invented by the papacy". The fee was later abandoned amid charges of simony.

Modern use 

The use of the pallium is reserved to the pope and archbishops who are metropolitans, but the latter may not use it until it is conferred upon them by the pope, normally at the celebration of the Feast of Saints Peter and Paul in June. Pope Francis modified the ritual of conferring the pallium in January 2015: The pallia will be blessed on the feast of Saints Peter and Paul in Saint Peter's Basilica; the metropolitan archbishops, however will receive those pallia in a separate ceremony within their home dioceses from the hands of the Apostolic Nuncio (who is the personal representative of the pope in their respective countries). The pallium is also conferred upon the Latin Rite Patriarch of Jerusalem. Previous traditions that allowed some other bishops to use the pallium were ended by Pope Paul VI in a motu proprio in 1978. A metropolitan archbishop may wear his pallium as a mark of his jurisdiction not only in his own archdiocese but anywhere in his ecclesiastical province whenever he celebrates Mass.

Although the pallium is now reserved, by law and liturgical norms, to metropolitans, a single standing exception has seemed to become customary: Pope John Paul II conferred a pallium on then-Cardinal Joseph Ratzinger when Ratzinger became Dean of the College of Cardinals and therefore also Cardinal Bishop of Ostia, a purely honorary title and one without an archbishopric or metropolitanate attached. When Ratzinger was elected Pope Benedict XVI, he continued that exception without comment by conferring the pallium on Cardinal Angelo Sodano, the new dean. The same was done by Pope Francis for Cardinal Giovanni Battista Re on 29 June 2020, when Cardinal Re became dean in January 2020.

Worn by the pope, the pallium symbolizes the plenitudo pontificalis officii (i.e., the "plenitude of pontifical office"); worn by archbishops, it typifies their participation in the supreme pastoral power of the pope, who concedes it to them for their proper church provinces. Similarly, after his resignation, he may not use the pallium; should he be transferred to another archdiocese, he must again petition the pope for a new pallium. The new pallia are solemnly blessed after the First Vespers on the feast of Saints Peter and Paul, and are then kept in a special silver-gilt casket near the Confessio Petri (tomb of St. Peter) until required. The pallium was formerly conferred in Rome by a cardinal deacon, and outside of Rome by a bishop; in both cases the ceremony took place after the celebration of Mass and the administration of an oath.

For his formal inauguration, Pope Benedict XVI adopted an earlier form of the pallium, from a period when it and the omophor were virtually identical. It is wider than the modern pallium although not as wide as the modern omophor, made of wool with black silk ends, and decorated with five red crosses, three of which are pierced with pins, symbolic of Christ's five wounds and the three nails, and it was worn crossed over the left shoulder. Only the Papal pallium was to take this distinctive form. Beginning with the Solemnity of Saints Peter and Paul (June 29, 2008) Benedict XVI reverted to a form similar to that worn by his recent predecessors, albeit in a larger and longer cut and with red crosses, therefore remaining distinct from pallia worn by metropolitans. This change, explained the Master of Pontifical Liturgical Celebrations Guido Marini, came about after recent studies on the history of the pallium, had shown that the oldest depiction of a pope wearing that type of pallium, that of Pope Innocent III at the Sacro Speco Cloister, seemed to be a deliberate archaism. Msgr. Marini also stated that Pope Benedict had had a series of annoying problems keeping it in place during liturgical celebrations. This pallium would later end up being worn by another pope when, while inspecting the damages caused by the 2009 L'Aquila earthquake Pope Benedict visited the badly stricken church of Santa Maria di Collemaggio. Here Pope Celestine V's remains had survived the earthquake, and after praying for a few minutes by his tomb, Benedict left the pallium on Celestine's glass casket. The last pope to abdicate willingly before Benedict XVI was Celestine V in 1294.

Although Pope Benedict XVI's second pallium was not actually made until 2008, the model for it already existed on his coat of arms. A scarcely known fact is that a precedent for Pope Benedict XVI's variations of the pallium was set in 1999 when Pope John Paul II wore a long Y-shaped pallium with red crosses for that year's Easter and Christmas celebrations. It was only used then time and was created by Piero Marini, the then Master of Pontifical Liturgical Celebrations, who would also create Pope Benedict's first pallium.

On June 29, 2014, after using Benedict XVI's second pallium for more than a year, Pope Francis restored the traditional pallium worn by popes prior to Benedict.

In January 2015, Pope Francis announced that, from that year's imposition on, the pallium would no longer be awarded personally by the Pope in Rome; instead, the corresponding archbishops would impose it in their local churches. The Pope, however, will continue to bless it beforehand.

Style 

There is a decided difference between the form of the modern pallium and that used in early Christian times, as portrayed in the Ravenna mosaics. The pallium of the sixth century was a long, moderately wide, white band of wool, ornamented at its extremity with a black or red cross, and finished off with tassels; it was draped around the neck, shoulders, and breast in such a manner that it formed a V in front, and the ends hung down from the left shoulder, one in front and one behind.

In the eighth century it became customary to let the ends fall down, one in the middle of the breast and the other in the middle of the back, and to fasten them there with pins, the pallium thus becoming Y-shaped. A further development took place during the ninth century (according to pictorial representations outside of Rome, in places where ancient traditions were not maintained so strictly): the band, which had hitherto been kept in place by the pins, was sewn Y-shaped, without, however, being cut.

The present circular form originated in the tenth or eleventh century. Two excellent early examples of this form, belonging respectively to Archbishop St. Heribert (1021) and Archbishop St. Anno (d. 1075), are preserved in Siegburg, Archdiocese of Cologne.

At first the only decorations on the pallium were two crosses near the extremities. This is proved by the mosaics at Ravenna and Rome. It appears that the ornamentation of the pallium with a greater number of crosses did not become customary until the ninth century, when small crosses were sewn on the pallium, especially over the shoulders. However, during the Middle Ages there was no definite rule regulating the number of crosses, nor was there any precept determining their colour. They were generally dark, but sometimes red. The pins, which at first served to keep the pallium in place, were retained as ornaments even after the pallium was sewn in the proper shape, although they no longer had any practical object. That the insertion of small leaden weights in the vertical ends of the pallium was usual as early as the thirteenth century is proved by the discovery in 1605 of the pallium enveloping the body of Boniface VIII, and by the fragments of the pallium found in the tomb of Clement IV.

Significance 
As early as the 6th century, the pallium was considered a liturgical vestment to be used only in the church, and indeed only during Mass, unless a special privilege determined otherwise. This is proved conclusively by the correspondence between Pope Gregory I and John of Ravenna concerning the use of the pallium  The rules regulating the original use of the pallium cannot be determined with certainty, but its use, even before the 6th century, seems to have had a definite liturgical character. From early times more or less extensive restrictions limited the use of the pallium to certain days. Its indiscriminate use, permitted to Hincmar of Reims by Leo IV (851) and to Bruno of Cologne by Agapetus II (954) was contrary to the general custom. In the 10th and 11th centuries, just as today, the general rule was to limit the use of the pallium to a few festivals and some other extraordinary occasions. The symbolic character now attached to the pallium dates back to the 8th century, when it was made an obligation for all metropolitans to petition the Holy See for permission to use it. The evolution of this character was complete about the end of the eleventh century; thenceforth the pallium is always designated in the papal bulls as the symbol of plenitudo pontificalis officii ("plenitude of pontifical office"). In the sixth century the pallium was the symbol of the papal office and the papal power, and for this reason Pope Felix transmitted his pallium to his archdeacon, when, contrary to custom, he nominated him his successor. On the other hand, when used by metropolitans, the pallium originally signified simply union with the Apostolic See, and was an ornament symbolizing the virtue and rank of its wearer.

See also 
Omophorion

Footnotes

Notes

References 
 
 
 
 
 
 
 —a monograph published by the Archdiocese of Cardiff to mark the bestowal of the Pallium on Archbishop George Stack in July 2011.
 
Schoenig, Steven A. Bonds of Wool: The Pallium and Papal Power in the Middle Ages (Washington, DC: The Catholic University of America Press, 2017. .
 
Attribution

Further reading 

A tradition in evolution: Pallium signifies authority, loyalty (Catholic News Service)
 Information about the sisters, weaving the papal Pallium

External links 

Catholic liturgy
Formal insignia
Papal vestments
Roman Catholic vestments